

Events

Year overall 
 Publishers Cartoon Books, Comic Zone Productions, Personality Comics, and Boneyard Press all enter the arena; First Comics stops publishing.
 Egmont UK bought Fleetway Publications. They merge it with London Editions to form Fleetway Editions.

January
Checkmate is canceled by DC Comics with issue #33.
 El Diablo vol. 2 is canceled by DC with issue #16.
 Count Duckula is canceled by the Marvel Comics imprint Star Comics with issue #15.
 Alien Legion: On The Edge is canceled with issue #3.
 Avengers Spotlight is cancelled with #40.

February
 The Amazing Spider-Man #344 - First appearance of Cletus Kasady, who later becomes the super-villain Carnage.
 Frank by Jim Woodring debuts in the second issue of Buzz.
 New Mutants #98 - Introduction of Deadpool, Domino, and Gideon. (Marvel Comics)
 Power Pack is canceled by Marvel with issue #62.
 Heathcliff is cancelled with issue #56.

March
 "Weapon X" begins in Marvel Comics Presents.
 With #12, Stalkers is cancelled by Epic Comics.
 With #4, The Last American is cancelled by Epic Comics.

April
 New Mutants #100, the title's final issue, featuring the debut of X-Force (Marvel Comics).
 With #6 Cadillacs & Dinosaurs is cancelled.
 With #5, Hollywood Superstars is cancelled.
 First issue of Seth's Palookaville
 Nightcat a one-shot comic book published by Marvel featuring real-life singer Jacqueline Tavarez. Written by Barry Dutter and drawn by Denys Cowan and Jimmy Palmiotti. The cover art by Joe Jusko was also used on the compact disc and cassette tape release of Tavarez's music album.

May
 May 11: The British girls' comics magazine Mandy merges with Judy.
W. B. Park receives the National Cartoonist Society Advertising and Illustration Award.

June
 June 15: In Turnhout, Belgium, a statue of Adhemar (from Marc Sleen's The Adventures of Nero) is revealed, made by Frank-Ivo Van Damme.
 The final issue of Françoise Mouly and Art Spiegelman's Raw is published.
 Armageddon 2001 crossover event.

July
 July 13: René Windig and Eddie de Jong (Heinz) receive the Stripschapprijs. The Jaarprijs voor Bijzondere Verdiensten (nowadays the P. Hans Frankfurtherprijs) goes to publishing company Big Balloon.
 In Brussels, Belgium, the first mural depicting a famous Belgian comics series (Frank Pé's Broussaille), is inaugurated. This launches the Brussels' Comic Book Route project.
 Superman: The Man of Steel #1 - debut issue of fourth ongoing Superman title. Written by Louise Simonson and drawn by Jon Bogdanove, Tom Grummett, Bob McLeod, Dan Jurgens, Dennis Janke, Jerry Ordway, and Brett Breeding.
 Wizard publishes its premiere issue.
 Muir Island Saga begins.
 With #10, Mighty Mouse is cancelled.
 With #80, The Transformers is cancelled by Marvel Comics.
 With #25, Yummy Fur moves to Drawn & Quarterly

August
 New Gods vol. 3 is canceled by DC with issue #28.
 With #19, Cloak & Dagger is cancelled.

September
 Alpha Flight #100: "The Final Option, Part Four: Decisions of Trust," written by Fabian Nicieza.
 With #2, Impossible Man Summer Vacation Spectacular is cancelled.
 With #4, Car Warriors is cancelled.
 With #3, Samurai Cat is cancelled.
 With #4, Damage Control v3 is cancelled.
 Everything's Archie is canceled by Archie Comics with issue #157.

October
 Crisis is canceled by Fleetway with issue #63.
 With #2, Legion of Night is cancelled.
 With #3, Terminator 2: Judgment Day is cancelled.
 With #4, Alpha Flight Special is cancelled.
 With #6, Sweet XVI is cancelled.
 With #10, Foolkiller v1 is cancelled.

November
 November 21 – the Marathi comic strip Chintoo is first published.
 Alpha Flight #102: Introduction of Wild Child as Weapon Omega.
 Maze Agency is canceled by Innovation Comics with issue #23.
 With #12, Marvel Comics' Zorro is cancelled.
 Daniel Clowes' Art School Confidential is prepublished in Eightball.

December
 December 1: In the Italian Disney magazine Topolino, the first episode of the Mickey Mouse story Topolino e un favore da nulla, by Carlo Panaro and Corrado Mastantuono is published. It markes the debut of Pierino and Pieretto, the two nephews of Peg-Leg Pete.
 December 31: The final episode of Marten Toonder's Panda is published. Running for 45 years it was his longest-running series in syndication.
 The Incredible Hulk #388: Jim Wilson revealed to be HIV-positive.

Specific date unknown
 The final episode of Costa Rican artist Fernando Zeledón Guzmán's satirical comic strip La Semana en Serio in the communist magazine Adelante is published.

Births

Deaths

January
 January 1: Dean Miller, American comics artist (Mighty O' Malley, continued Vic Flint), dies at age 52.
 January 5: John Lehti, American comics artist (Tommy of the Big Top), dies at age 78.
 January 16: Maurieta Wellman, American illustrator, painter and comics artist (Goofus and Gallant), dies at age 88.
 January 24: J.H. Koeleman, jr., Dutch illustrator and comics artist (Pinkie Pienter, aka Ronny Roberts), dies at age 64.

February
 February 11: Michel Mahy, Belgian comics artist (De Spookjes, assisted on Bessy), dies at age 42.
 February 15: Hans Borrebach, Dutch comic artist, passes away at age 87.
 February 19: Gradie Knipscheer, Dutch comics artist and musician (Keesje Konijntje), dies at age 76.

March
 March 15: Govindan Aravindan, Indian film director and comic artist (Cheriya Manushyarum Valiya Lokavum, Ramuvinte Sahasika Yathrakal, Guruji), passes away at age 56.
 March 29: Sytze Henstra, Dutch illustrator, cartoonist and painter (sports cartoons for De Telegraaf), dies at age 96.

April
 April 4: Graham Ingels, American comics artist (EC Comics), dies at age 75 from stomach cancer.
 April 19: Frederik Bramming, Danish animator and comics artist (Frederik, Chas, Motorskatten), dies at age 79.

May
 May 1: Adolfo Samper, Colombian comics artist (Mojicón, La Hermana de Mojicón, Los Filipicines, Godofredo Cascarrabias, Don Amancise), dies at age 91.
 May 6: Guido Martina, Italian comics writer (L'Inferno di Topolino), dies at age 85. 
 May 8: Kathleen O'Brien, Australian comics artist (Wanda the War Girl), passes away at age 76.
 May 10: Adolfo Aizen, Brazilian journalist and comic publisher, dies at age 83. 
 May 14: Joy Batchelor, British animator and film director (Halas & Batchelor), dies at age 77. 
 May 20: Milko Bambič, Slovene illustrator, painter, novelist and comics artist (Zamorček Bu-ci-bu, in English best known as Little Negro Bu-ci-bu), passes away at age 86. 
 May 27: Ed Dodd, American comics artist (Mark Trail), dies at age 88.
 May 29: Hans Brouwer, aka Ipse, Dutch comics artist (Fed en Vetertje), dies at age 74.
 May 31: Paul Campani, Italian comic artist (Mister X, Gey Carioca, Tita Dinamita, Bull Rocket, worked on Asso di Picche), dies at age 67.

June
 June 3: Vince Colletta, Italian-American comics artist and inker (drew many romance comics and worked for Marvel Comics and DC Comics), dies at age 67.
 June 6: Gianni De Luca, Italian comics artist (Commissario Spada), passes away at age 64.
 June 10: Jean Bruller, aka Vercors, French novelist, illustrator and comics artist (Le Mariage de Monsieur Lakonik), dies at age 89.
 June 10: Milorad Dobrić, Yugoslavian (Serbian) comics artist (Pera Pesak, Ljuba Truba, Kurir Fica, Slavuj Gilsa, Inspektor Zuca), dies at age 66.
 June 27: Virginia Huget, American comics artist (Gentlemen Prefer Blondes, Babs in Society, Campus Capers, Miss Aladdin, Molly the Manicure Girl, continued Skippy and Oh Diana!), dies at age 91.

July
 July 4: 
 Fernand Cheneval, Swiss-Belgian comics artist and publisher (founder of the magazine Heroïc Albums), passes away at age 73.
 Art Sansom, American comics artist (The Born Loser), dies at age 70.
 July 6: Nicholas P. Dallis, American comics writer (Rex Morgan, M.D., Judge Parker, Apartment 3-G), passes away at age 89. 
 July 9: Petr Sadecký, Czech comics artist (Octobriana), passes away.
 July 31: Jess Benton, American comics artist (Jasper Jooks), passes away at age 90.

August
 August 10: Jerzy Wroblewski, Polish comic artist (Risk, Underground Front, Captain Zbik), dies at age 50. 
 August 18: Rick Griffin, American underground comix artist (Flying Eyeball, Murphy, Man From Utopia) dies at age 47 in a motorcycle accident.
 August 24: Reynold Brown, American poster designer and comics artist (continued Tailspin Tommy), dies at age 73.
 Specific date in August unknown: James De Carlo, American comic artist (Archie Comics), dies at age 43.

September
 September 4: Bing Coughlin, Canadian advertising illustrator and comics artist (Herbie), dies at age 86.
 September 5: Carol Kalish, American comics publisher and vice President of New Product Development at Marvel Comics, dies at age 36 from a brain aneurysm.
 September 13: Edmond Good, Canadian illustrator and comics artist (Rex Baxter, Johnny Law, Sky Ranger, assisted on Scorchy Smith, Bruce Gentry - Daredevil of the Skies, Casey Ruggles and Dixie Dugan), passes away at age 81.
 September 18: Vinicio Berti, Italian painter and comics artist (Atomino, Chiodino, Ciondolino, Gian Burrasca), passes away at age 70.
 September 24: 
 Dom Orejudos, American illustrator and comics artist (Meatman, Startrick), dies at age 58 from AIDS.
 Dr. Seuss, American children's novelist, illustrator, animator and comics artist (Hejji), dies at age 87.

October
 October 2: George Vakalo, Greek painter, set designer, costume maker, writer and comic artist, dies at age 86 or 87 .
 October 16: Henricus Kannegieter, Dutch illustrator and comics artist (made various one-shot comics in the 1930s), dies at age 93.
 October 23: Antonio Canale, Italian comics artist (Amok), passes away at age 76.

November
 November 7: Tom of Finland, Finnish comics artist and illustrator, passes away at age 71.
 November 11: 
 Franziska Bilek, German comics artist and illustrator (worked for Simplicissimus), passes away at age 85.
 Mikhail Kupriyanov, Russian painter, illustrator and poster designer (member of the collective Kukryniksy), dies at age 88.
 November 18: Reg Parlett, British comics artist (Ivor Lott and Tony Broke, Mustapha Million), passes away at age 87.
 Specific date unknown: Neville Colvin, British comics artist (Ginger & Co., comic strip based on James Bond, continued Modesty Blaise), dies at age 72.

December
 December 3: Alex Graham, Scottish comics artist (Fred Basset), dies at age 78.
 December 21: Sheldon Mayer, American comics artist (Sugar and Spike), dies at age 74.
 December 29: Tony Strobl, American animator and comics artist (Disney comics, Looney Tunes comics, Hanna-Barbera comics), dies at age 76.

Specific date unknown
 Albert Edgard Beard, British comics artist and illustrator (The Gaisby Knights), dies at age 88 or 89.
 Gordon Boshell, British novelist, journalist and comics writer (Garth), dies at age 81 or 82.
 Jaap Lamberton, Dutch illustrator and comics artist (worked on Panda), passes away at age 45.
 Charles Popineau, French illustrator and comics artist (worked on the Le Crime ne Paie Pas and Les Amours Célèbres series), dies at age 65 or 66.
 Alberto Romero, Argentine comics artist (Roberto, un as del Deporte, continued El Vengador), dies at age 75 or 76.
 Eugen Taru, Romanian illustrator, caricaturist and comics artist ('Barbăcot), dies at age 78.

Conventions
 April 27–28: WonderCon (Oakland Convention Center, Oakland, California) — guests include Kevin Eastman, Mark Bodé, Miguel Ferrer, Bill Mumy, Steve Leialoha, and Max Allan Collins
 June: Heroes Convention (Charlotte, North Carolina)
 June 21–23: Comix Fair (Holiday Inn-Medical Center, Houston, Texas) — ninth annual convention; guests include Russ Heath, Nestor Redondo, Jeff Millar, Bill Hinds, and Richard Klaw
 June 21–23: Chicago Comicon (Ramada O'Hare, Rosemont, Illinois) — guests include Jim Steranko, Kevin Eastman, and Chris Claremont
 July: Tri-State Con (New York City) — guests include Michael Avon Oeming, Evan Dorkin, Nat Gertler, Romeo Tanghal, Paul Ryan, Bob Wiacek, and Mike Manley
 July 4–7: San Diego Comic-Con (San Diego Convention Center and Pan Pacific Hotel, San Diego, California): 15,000+ attendees; official guests: Clive Barker, Dan DeCarlo, Harlan Ellison, Neil Gaiman, Keith Giffen, Joe Haldeman, Lynn Johnston, Joe Kubert, Jim Lee, Don Maitz, Sheldon Moldoff, Rick Sternbach, and Janny Wurts
 July 12–14: Dragon Con/Atlanta Comics Expo (Atlanta Hilton & Towers, Atlanta, Georgia) — 5,200 attendees; guests include Philip José Farmer and Frank Miller
 July 19–21: Dallas Fantasy Fair (Dallas, Texas) — presentation of the Harvey Awards
 July 26–28: Atlanta Fantasy Fair (Atlanta Hilton & Towers, Atlanta, Georgia) — official guests include Marina Sirtis, Dean Stockwell, Marc Singer, Matt Wagner, Julius Schwartz, Greg Bear
 September 21–22: Miamicon (Ft. Lauderdale Design Center Sheraton Hotel, Ft. Lauderdale, Florida; and Miami Marriott, Miami, Florida) — guests include Chris Warner, Evan Dorkin, Bob Schreck, and Matt Wagner
 November: Mid-Ohio Con (Ohio)

Awards

First issues by title

DC Comics
 Deathstroke the Terminator
 Superman: The Man of Steel

Limited series
 Black Canary
 Release: November.

Dark Horse Comics
 Star Wars: Dark Empire

Marvel Comics
 Barbie
 Release: January
 Barbie Fashion
 Release: January.
 Bill & Ted's Excellent Comic Book
 Release: December.
 Captain Planet and the Planeteers
 Release: October.
 Darkhawk
 Release: March.
 Deathlok v2
 Release: July.
 The Destroyer v3
 Release: December.
 Double Dragon
 Release: July.
 Original Ghost Rider Rides Again
 Release: July.
 NFL SuperPro
 Release: October.
 Sleepwalker
 Release: June.
 Sweet XVI
 Release: May.
 The Toxic Avenger
 Release: April.
 Wonder Man
 Release: September.
 X-Force v1
 Release: August.
 X-Men v2
 Release: October.

Limited series
 Adventures of Captain America
 Release: September.
 Alpha Flight Special
 Release: July.
 Captain Confederacy
 Release: November by Epic Comics.
 Car Warriors
 Release: June by Epic Comics.
 Damage Control v3
 Release: June.
 Deadly Foes of Spider-Man
 Release: May.
 Deathlok Special (reprint of Deathlok v1)
 Release: May.
 The Infinity Gauntlet
 Release: July.
 Legion of Night
 Release: September.
 The Pirates of Dark Water
 Release: November.
 Samurai Cat
 Release: June by Epic Comics.
 Spider-Man Saga
 Release: November.
 Terminator 2
 Release: September.
 The Transmutation of Ike Garuda
 Release: July by Epic Comics.
 Weaveworld
 Release: December by Epic Comics.

Independent

 Bone
 Release: July by Cartoon Books
 Dirty Plotte
 Release: January by Drawn & Quarterly
 Palookaville
 Release: April by Drawn & Quarterly
 Rubber Blanket
 Release: by Rubber Blanket Press

Initial appearance by character name

DC Comics
 Abattoir in Detective Comics #625
 Alexandre LeRoi in Batman: Master of the Future
 Atomic Skull II in Adventures of Superman #483
 Bloody Mary in Hawk and Dove vol. 2 #21 (February )
 Donna Cavanaugh in The Sandman #32 (November )
 Chantinelle in Hellblazer #43 (July )
 Destruction of the Endless in The Sandman Special #1 (November )
 Electrocutioner II in Detective Comics #626 (February )
 General Glory I in Justice League America # 46 (January )
 King Snake in Robin #2 (February )
 Linear Men in Adventures of Superman #476 (March )
 Lynx II in Robin v1 #1 (January )
 Mirage II in The New Titans #79
 Monarch I in Armageddon 2001 #2 (October )
 Nightrider in New Titans Annual #7
 Pantha in New Titans #73 (February )
 Speed Queen in Hawk and Dove vol. 2 #21 (February )
 Terra II in New Titans #79 (September )
 Ron Troupe in Adventures of Superman #480 (July )
 Malice Vundabar in Hawk and Dove vol. 2 #21 (February )
 Waverider in Armageddon 2001 #1 (May)
 Paul Westfield in Superman Vol. 2, #58 (August )

Marvel Comics
 8-Ball in Sleepwalker #1 (June )
 Helmut in The Incredible Hulk #379 (March )
 Lucas Bishop in Uncanny X-Men #282 (November )
 G.W. Bridge in X-Force v1 #1 (August )
 Copycat in New Mutants #98 (February )
 Abraham Cornelius in Marvel Comics Presents #73 (March )
 Fabian Cortez in X-Men vol. 2, #1 (October )
 Cyber in Marvel Comics Presents #85 (September )
 Darkhawk in Darkhawk #1 (March )
 Deadpool in The New Mutants #98 (February )
 Devos the Devastator in Fantastic Four #359 (December )
 Marco Delgado in X-Men v. 2, #1 (October )
 Wyndell Dichinson in Web of Spider-Man #81 (October )
 Feral in New Mutants vol. 1, #99 (March )
 Firebrand II in Web of Spider-Man vol. 1, #77 (June )
 Trevor Fitzroy in Uncanny X-Men #281 (October )
 Muriel Frost in Doctor Who Magazine #169
 Gauntlet I in X-Factor v. 1, #65 (April )
 Gideon in New Mutants (vol. 1) #98 (February )
 Impala in Captain America #388 (July )
 Krugarr in Guardians of the Galaxy Annual #1
 Lodestone in Darkhawk #7 (September )
 Fabian Marechal-Julbin in New Warriors #9 (March )
 Nox in Doctor Strange, Sorcerer Supreme #31 (July )
 Paibok in Fantastic Four Vol. 1, #358 (November )
 Phobos I in Dr. Strange, Sorcerer Supreme #32 (August )
 Phoenix (Giraud) in Guardians of the Galaxy #11 (April )
 Protégé in Guardians of the Galaxy #15 (August )
 Psynapse in X-Factor #65 (April )
 Rancor in Guardians of the Galaxy #8 (January )
 Replica in Guardians of the Galaxy #9 (February )
 Shatterstar in New Mutants vol. 1, #99 (March )
 Shinobi Shaw in X-Factor #67 (June )
 Sleepwalker in Sleepwalker #1
 Speedfreek in The Incredible Hulk #388 (December )
 Squirrel Girl in Marvel Super-Heroes Special vol. 2, #8 (Winter)
 Jeremy Stevens in Uncanny X-Men #283 (December )
 Carl Stricklan in Daredevil Annual #9
 Talon in Guardians of the Galaxy #18 (November )
 Tusk in X-Factor #65 (April )
 Nathan Taylor in The Incredible Hulk #379 (December )
 Weapon X II in X-Force v. 1, #2 (September )
 Buford Wilson in New Warriors vol. 1, #9 (March )
 John Wraith in Wolverine (vol. 2) #48 (November )
 Zodiak in Ghost Rider Vol. 3, #10 (February )

Other publishers
 Detective-Judge Armitage in Judge Dredd Megazine v.1, #9 (Fleetway, June)
 Lady Death in Evil Ernie #1 (Chaos! Comics, December )
 Erica Pierce in Solar, Man of the Atom v. 2, #1 (Valiant Comics, September )

References